Alfredo Trifogli (22 September 1920 – 21 March 2013) was an Italian politician who served as a Senator for two legislatures (1976–1979, 1987) and Mayor of Ancona for three terms (1964, 1969–1973, 1973–1976).

References

1920 births
2013 deaths
Mayors of Ancona
Senators of Legislature VII of Italy
Senators of Legislature IX of Italy